Antonio Grimaldi (Genoa, 1640 - Genoa, 1717) was the 137th Doge of the Republic of Genoa and king of Corsica.

Biography 
Elected by the Grand Council of 1 August 1703, the ninety-second Doge of the Republic of Genoa in two-year succession and the one hundred and thirty-seventh in republican history. As doge he was also invested with the related biennial office of king of Corsica. After the dogate ended on 1 August 1705, Antonio Grimaldi would continue to serve the Genoese state. He died in Genoa during 1717 without contracting marriage and therefore without children.

See also 

 Republic of Genoa
 Doge of Genoa
 House of Grimaldi

Sources 

 Buonadonna, Sergio. Rosso doge. I dogi della Repubblica di Genova dal 1339 al 1797.

18th-century Doges of Genoa
Politicians from Genoa
1640 births
1717 deaths